Andrés Felipe Murillo Segura (born April 1, 1996) is a Colombian professional footballer who plays for Santos Laguna of Liga MX.

External links
 
 

Living people
1996 births
Colombian footballers
Colombian expatriate footballers
Association football defenders
La Equidad footballers
Santos Laguna footballers
Categoría Primera A players
Colombian expatriate sportspeople in Mexico
Expatriate footballers in Mexico
Sportspeople from Valle del Cauca Department